Gábor Herendi (born 2 December 1960) is a Hungarian film director.

Filmography
 Valami Amerika (2002)
 Magyar vándor (2004)
 Lora (2007)
  (2008)
  (2017)
 Valami Amerika 3. (2018)
 Toxikoma (2021)
 Bűnös város (2021)

References

External links
 

1960 births
Living people
Hungarian film directors
Film people from Budapest